Lgov Prison, officially Penal Colony No. 3 ( or ), is a prison in Lgov, Kursk Oblast, in southwestern Russia. Lgov is located south of Moscow. It is operated by the Federal Penitentiary Service.

In June 2005 hundreds of prisoners, en masse, slashed themselves with razors to protest perceived violations of their rights. The prisoners cut their legs, necks, and wrists. Afterwards, 179 prisoners sought medical attention for the self-inflicted injuries.

References

External links

Prison Camp No. 3 - Federal Penitentiary Service, Kursk Oblast

Buildings and structures in Kursk Oblast
Prisons in Russia